Secession Hall may refer to:

St. Andrew's Hall, Charleston, also known as Secession Hall, a public building in Charleston, South Carolina, United States
Secession hall (Austria), the Secession exhibition hall situated in Vienna, Austria

Architectural disambiguation pages